Lemnaphila scotlandae is a species of shore flies in the family Ephydridae. Larvae are leaf-miners of duckweed.

Distribustion
Canada, United States.

References

Ephydridae
Insects described in 1933
Diptera of North America
Taxa named by Ezra Townsend Cresson